Get Wiser Live is a DVD recorded on January 6, 2006 by reggae band SOJA at the State Theatre in Falls Church, Virginia.  The show consisted of two separate sets, with the opening set being older songs, and the second set being Get Wiser in its entirety.

Track listing
 "Sabrina"
 "Vespa Mania"
 "Kebersamaan"
 "Rastaman Rastawati"
 "Anak Pantai"

Personnel

Guests
Guests on the DVD include those featured on the studio album.
From Gomba Jahbari:
 Carmelo Romero - vocals
 Misael Clemente - saxophone, flute
 Jahaziel Garcia - trumpet

From Rare Essence:
 Milton "Go Go Mickey" Freeman - congas

From the Eddie Drennon String Quartet:
 Eddie Drennon - violin 1
 Lerna May-Frandsen - violin 2
 Julius Wirth - viola
 Henry Mays - cello

Video crew
Camera Crews:
Rip Bang Pictures
 Tommy Braswell, Director of Photography
 Dick Bangham
 Divine Kemayu
 Ralston Smith
 Smiley Moys
 Sam Steward

Hendy Street Produxions

 Tony Morin
 Brian Terlep
 Chris Burns
 Charity Ruiter

Audio crew
Live Recording:
Big Mo Recording Services
 Greg Hartman
 Chris Weal
 Mike Caplan
Lion & Fox Recording Studios
 Mixed & mastered by Jim Fox

State theatre crew
 Derrick Parker
 Chris Gulino
 Dempsey Hamilton
 Tim Pace

References

External links
SOJAmusic.com

SOJA albums
Reggae video albums
2007 video albums
Live video albums
2007 live albums